Paul James Rooney is an English dancer, choreographer & music artist.
He has danced with various companies and choreographers around the world, including names such as; Matthew Bourne, Tim Rushton, Will Tuckett, Danish Dance Theatre & has choreographed many productions for Tivoli (Copenhagen)

Paul James Rooney is also known for competing on the first series of Den Vildeste Danser - the Danish version of Syco Entertainment's  The Greatest Dancer.

In October 2020 Paul James Rooney released his debut single "Shine"

Dance career

Paul James has danced for many companies, including; New Adventures, English National Ballet, Danish Dance Theatre, Tivoli Ballet Theatre and Alvin Ailey Dance Theater in their Copenhagen performance of Memoria. 
Paul James Rooney was one of the ballet dancers representing the Royal Opera House in the closing ceremony of the Beijing 2008 Olympics dancing with Leona Lewis and Jimmy Page.
Paul James has danced Principal roles in The Royal Opera House's 'Pinocchio', 'Peter and the Wolf' in New York, and in various Bournonville productions for Tivoli Ballet Theatre. 
Paul James performed in 'Wind in the Willows' at The Royal Opera House & The Duchess Theatre, in London's West End.

Rooney was the rehearsal director for Peter and the Wolf staging productions in New York and The Netherlands.

He has also danced musicals including the role of Mr. Mistoffelees in Cats in Denmark and the role of Older Billy in Billy Elliot the Musical in Malmo, Sweden. and Dance of the Vampires at Det Ny Teater, Copenhagen.

Music

Paul James Rooney released his debut single Shine in autumn 2020. A song reflecting his struggles in both his private life and working life.

Choreography
Paul James Rooney is a frequent choreographer for Tivoli Ballet Theatre.
 2009  Polyphony 
 2010  Mezclanza - alongside August Bournonville's Le Conservatoire and Peter Martins Barber Violin Concerto. 
 2012  Havets Bevægelser - a joint venture with Storstrøms Kammerensemble and Pantomimeteatret. Premiered at Fuglesang Herregaard and then performed in Tivoli - re-premiered in 2013.
 2014  Big Band Dance - dance performance collaborating with Tivoli Big Band. 
 2017  Butterfly Lovers - ballet created to the Butterfly Lovers' Violin Concerto - re-premiered in 2018
 2017  Partita - performed with Tivoli Symphony Orchestra in Tivoli concert Hall (alongside a re-premier of Havets Bevægelser)
 2019  Et Glimt af I Går, I dag - Dance Production inspired by Danish Design
 2020  Et Glimt af I Går, I dag - Restaging 

Paul James has also choreographed various performances for TV, Music Videos, Events and Elmhurst Ballet School

In 2015 & 2017 Paul James choreographed for TV series 'Vidunderbørn' produced by Nordisk Film for DR

He currently resides in Copenhagen .

References

External links
 Article on rehearsals for Havets Bevægelser
 Interview - Terpsichore 2011
 Paul James Rooney - Official Website
 

English choreographers
Ballet choreographers
1984 births
Living people
People from Sandhurst, Berkshire
English National Ballet dancers
People educated at the Elmhurst School for Dance
English male ballet dancers